Chantal Gibson is a Canadian writer, poet, artist and educator. Her 2019 poetry collection How She Read won the 2020 Pat Lowther Award, the 2020 Dorothy Livesay Poetry Prize at the BC and Yukon Book Prizes, and was a shortlisted 2020 Griffin Poetry Prize finalist. Gibson’s art and writing confronts colonialism, cultural erasure, and representations of Black women in Western culture.

Biography 
Chantal Gibson is a writer-artist-educator based on the ancestral lands of the Coast Salish Peoples in Vancouver, British Columbia, where she is a lecturer in written and visual communication at Simon Fraser University’s School of Interactive Arts and Technology (SIAT). Gibson was the recipient of the SFU Excellence in Teaching Award in 2016.

Gibson went to high school in Mackenzie, BC. Her mother is an African-Canadian who grew up in Nova Scotia.

Career

Bibliography 

 2019 - Gibson, Chantal N. How She Read : Poems. Caitlin Press
 2021 - Gibson, Chantal N. with/holding : Poems. Caitlin Press

Awards 

 2016 - SFU Excellence in Teaching Award, Simon Fraser University
 2020 - Dorothy Livesay Poetry Prize at the BC and Yukon Book Prizes
 2020 - Pat Lowther Award for Best Book of Poetry by a Canadian woman, League of Canadian Poets
 2020 - Griffin Poetry Prize, Canadian Shortlist
 2021 - 3M National Teaching Fellowship, Society for Teaching and Learning in Higher Education (STLHE)

Exhibitions 

 2014 - TOME. SFU Surrey Library (2014)
 2014 - Between Friends: Crossings, Myths and Border Stories. Defiance College Women's Gallery, Defiance Ohio
 2015 - TOME. Vancouver Public Library, Vancouver, BC
 2018 - Here We Are Here: Black Canadian Contemporary Art. ROM Toronto and Musee des Beaux Arts Montreal
 2018 - MORPH: Changing the Past. (Inaugural group exhibit) Vancouver Public Library, Main Branch
 2019 - How She Read: Confronting the Romance of Empire. (Solo exhibit) Open Space Gallery, Victoria, BC
2019 - TOME. McPherson Library, University of Victoria, Victoria, BC
2019 - Here We Are Here: Black Canadian Contemporary Art. Art Gallery of Nova Scotia, Halifax
2020 - Who's Who. Senate of Canada chamber foyer, Ottawa, ON
2020 - Where do we go from here? (Group exhibit) Vancouver Art Gallery, Vancouver, BC
2021 - Human Capital. (Group exhibit) MacKenzie Art Gallery, Regina, SK
2021 - un/settled. In collaboration with Otoniya J. Okot Bitek. SFU Belzberg Library, Vancouver BC
2021 - Tyranny. (Group exhibition) Art Gallery of Nova Scotia, Halifax

Artist-in-residence 

 2017 - Visiting artist, OCAD University Writing & Learning Centre, Toronto, ON

References

21st-century Canadian poets
21st-century Canadian women writers
Canadian women poets
Writers from Vancouver
Black Canadian women
Black Canadian writers
Living people
Year of birth missing (living people)